This is a summary of the first 25 episodes of the 46-episode drama series All Is Well. The series is directed by Jian Chuanhe and stars Yao Chen, Ni Dahong, Guo Jingfei, Li Nian, Tony Yang, Gao Xin, and Gao Lu. The series premiered on March 1, 2019 on Zhejiang Television and Jiangsu Television.

Episodes

References

Lists of Chinese drama television series episodes
Television episodes set in China